In semiotics, linguistics, sociology and anthropology, context refers to those objects or entities which surround a focal event, in these disciplines typically a communicative event, of some kind. Context is "a frame that surrounds the event and provides resources for its appropriate interpretation". It is thus a relative concept, only definable with respect to some focal event within a frame, not independently of that frame.

In linguistics 
In the 19th century, it was debated whether the most fundamental principle in language was contextuality or compositionality, and compositionality was usually preferred. Verbal context  refers to the text or speech surrounding an expression (word, sentence, or speech act). Verbal context influences the way an expression is understood; hence the norm of not citing people out of context. Since much contemporary linguistics takes texts, discourses, or conversations as the object of analysis, the modern study of verbal context takes place in terms of the analysis of discourse structures and their mutual relationships, for instance the coherence relation between sentences.

Neurolinguistic analysis of context has shown that the interaction between interlocutors defined as parsers creates a reaction in the brain that reflects predictive and interpretative reactions. It can be said then, that mutual knowledge, co-text, genre, speakers, hearers create a neurolinguistic composition of context.

Traditionally, in sociolinguistics, social contexts were defined in terms of objective social variables, such as those of class, gender, age or race. More recently, social contexts tend to be defined in terms of the social identity being construed and displayed in text and talk by language users. Influenced by space.

The influence of context parameters on language use or discourse is usually studied in terms of language variation, style or register (see Stylistics). The basic assumption here is that language users adapt the properties of their language use (such as intonation, lexical choice, syntax, and other aspects of formulation) to the current communicative situation. In this sense, language use or discourse may be called more or less 'appropriate' in a given context.

In linguistic anthropology 
In the theory of sign phenomena, adapted from that of Charles Sanders Peirce, which forms the basis for much contemporary work in linguistic anthropology, the concept of context is integral to the definition of the index, one of the three classes of signs comprising Peirce's second trichotomy. An index is a sign which signifies by virtue of "pointing to" some component in its context, or in other words an indexical sign is related to its object by virtue of their co-occurrence within some kind of contextual frame.

In natural language processing 
In word-sense disambiguation, the meanings of words are inferred from the context where they occur.

Contextual variables 
Communicative systems presuppose contexts that are structured in terms of particular physical and communicative dimensions, for instance time, location, and communicative role.

See also
Aberrant decoding
Context principle
Context-sensitive language
Conversational scoreboard
Deixis
Opaque context

References

Further reading
 For a review of the history of the principle of contextuality in linguistics, see Scholtz, Oliver Robert (1999) Verstehen und Rationalität: Untersuchungen zu den Grundlagen von Hermeneutik und Sprachphilosophie

Sociolinguistics
Discourse analysis
Pragmatics